Slatwall (also known as slotwall) is a building material used in shopfitting for wall coverings or display fixtures. It consists of panels, usually 4 ft. by 8 ft., made with horizontal grooves that are configured to accept a variety of merchandising accessories.
The panels are typically made from medium-density fiberboard (MDF), with a finish such as melamine paper pressed or laminated onto one or both sides. Grooves are then machined into the board and painted or fitted with plastic or aluminum inserts.

References

Retail store elements